John Nesheim is an American author, and venture capitalist who teaches entrepreneurship for Cornell University and other universities in Asia and Europe. His research findings are used by entrepreneurs, investors, governments, universities, corporations, and Wall Street. Nesheim is the author of the book High Tech Startup.

References 

Year of birth missing (living people)
Living people
Cornell University faculty
Johnson School faculty